Ronke Ademiluyi is a Nigerian fashion expert and entrepreneur. She is a graduate of Law. Ronke Ademiluyi is a princess of Ile-Ife in Osun State, South-Western Nigeria; she is a great-granddaughter of Ọ̀ọ̀ni Ademiluyi Ajagun. Ronke Ademiluyi is a wife of Oba Adeyeye Enitan Ogunwusi. She is the founder of the Africa Fashion Week, a project that promotes African fashion designers through its subsidiaries, the Africa Fashion Week Nigeria and the Africa Fashion Week London.

References

Living people
Nigerian businesspeople
Nigerian fashion businesspeople
Yoruba women in business
Nigerian women lawyers
English people of Nigerian descent
English people of Yoruba descent
Year of birth missing (living people)